Stay Close is a British mystery drama miniseries based on the 2012 Harlan Coben novel of the same title, produced by Red Production Company for Netflix. The eight-episode series was released on 31 December 2021.

Plot 
Megan Pierce is a suburban mum living in the fictional suburb of Livingstone, and is hiding a murky past. She has found her soulmate in Dave, and they have three great kids. Ray Levine was once a talented documentary photographer. Losing the woman he loved changed him. Now he is in a dead-end job, playing a paparazzo-for-hire, pandering to rich kid pseudo-celebrities. Michael Broome is a detective still haunted by a cold case from seventeen years ago, when local husband and father, Stewart Green, disappeared without any trace. Green's wife still waits for Stewart to return.

When another man goes missing on the anniversary of Stewart's disappearance, Broome takes the case in the hope of exorcising his demons. Lives are in danger of being ruined, relationships splintered, as Broome's investigations open old wounds, stir up memories, and threaten to expose the truth. Weaving their way through the spaces of what binds these three lives together are a couple of colourful psychopaths, intent on completing their own agenda.

Cast 

 Cush Jumbo as Megan Pierce-Shaw / Cassie Morris, a former stripper, now engaged with three children.
 James Nesbitt as DS Michael Broome, a burned-out police detective.
 Richard Armitage as Ray Levine, a photojournalist looking for his missing girlfriend.
 Sarah Parish as Lorraine Griggs, a mysterious woman from Megan's past.
 Eddie Izzard as Harry Sutton, a lawyer and a former associate of Megan's. 
 Jo Joyner as DC Erin Cartwright, Broome's detective partner and ex-wife.
 Youssef Kerkour as Fester, Ray's friend.
 Daniel Francis as Dave Shaw, Megan's fiancé.
 Dylan Francis as Jordan Shaw 
 Tallulah Byrne as Laura Shaw
 Andi Osho as Simona
 Bethany Antonia as Kayleigh Shaw
 Rachel Andrews as Bea, Kayleigh's friend.
 Poppy Gilbert as Barbie
 Hyoie O'Grady as Ken
 Jack Shalloo as DCS Brian Goldberg, Broome's superior.
 Phillip Gascoyne as Chief Inspector Gary Blakefield
 Belinda Stewart-Wilson as Sarah Green

Background 
In August 2018, American writer Harlan Coben signed a five-year deal with Netflix. Under the deal, Coben would have 14 of his novels adapted as Netflix series, with him serving as producer on all of them. Stay Close follows other Coben-created Netflix originals Safe (2018), The Stranger, The Woods (both 2020), The Innocent, and Gone for Good (both 2021).

Episodes

Production

Development
The series, comprising eight episodes, was announced by Netflix in October 2020. At the time, Danny Brocklehurst was announced as head writer for the series with Daniel O'Hara as lead Director.

Casting
The main cast were revealed to be Cush Jumbo, James Nesbitt, Richard Armitage and Sarah Parish. In February 2021, Netflix announced that several new people would be joining the cast, including Eddie Izzard, Andi Osho, Daniel Francis, Jo Joyner, Bethany Antonia and Rachel Andrews.

Filming 
Filming of Stay Close began on 18 February 2021 and wrapped on 30 July 2021. The series was filmed in Brinscall, Lancashire, and around Manchester, St Helens, Runcorn, Widnes, Ashton-under-Lyne, Blackpool, Formby, Morecambe and North West England including Runcorn's Silver Jubilee Bridge. Jaume Plensa‘s sculpture Dream was featured heavily.

Music 
The score was composed by David Buckley and Luke Richards.

Reception
The review aggregator website Rotten Tomatoes reported a 92% approval rating with an average rating of 6.2/10, based on 13 critic reviews. Metacritic, which uses a weighted average, assigned a score of 51 out of 100 based on 7 critics, indicating "mixed or average reviews".

References

External links
 
 

2021 British television series debuts
2021 British television series endings
2020s British crime drama television series
2020s British mystery television series
2020s British television miniseries
English-language Netflix original programming
British thriller television series
Television shows based on American novels
Television series about families
Television series about missing people
Television series by Red Production Company
Television series by StudioCanal
Television shows filmed in England